Ben Reveno (born March 29, 1999) is an American professional soccer player who plays for Birmingham Legion on loan from New England Revolution in Major League Soccer.

Career

College and amateur
Reveno was born in San Jose, California. He played two years at UC Irvine in 2017-18 before moving to UCLA between 2019 and 2021, making 49 appearances.  He was named to the 2021 All-Far West Region Second Team.

Reveno also played for San Jose Earthquakes Academy for three years.

Professional
On January 18, 2022, Reveno was selected by the New England Revolution in the second round (52 overall) of the Major League Soccer SuperDraft.

On February 2, 2022, Reveno signed with the Revs second team, MLS Next Pro side New England Revolution II.

On May 25, 2022, Reveno started for the first team in a US Open Cup match vs New York City FC.  Six days later, Reveno signed with the first team.

On March 6, 2023, Reveno signed on a season-long loan with USL Championship side Birmingham Legion.

Career statistics

Club

References

External links
 

Living people
1999 births
American soccer players
Association football defenders
Birmingham Legion FC players
Major League Soccer players
MLS Next Pro players
New England Revolution players
New England Revolution II players
People from San Jose, California
Soccer players from California
UCLA Bruins men's soccer players